The Dublin, Georgia riot of 1919 were a series of violent racial riots between white and black members of Dublin, Georgia.

Racial violence
During a race riot local African-American, Rob Ashely, was accused in the murder of a white man and wounding another man on July 6, 1919. While in jail the local white community threatened to storm the jail and lynch Ashely. They were thwarted by an armed black community group that was formed to protect the jail and prevent a lynching. Later a company of eighty home guards prevented further trouble, but for weeks the situation was tense.

Aftermath

This uprising was one of several incidents of civil unrest that began in the so-called American Red Summer, of 1919. The Summer consisted of terrorist attacks on black communities, and white oppression in over three dozen cities and counties. In most cases, white mobs attacked African American neighborhoods. In some cases, black community groups resisted the attacks, especially in Chicago and Washington, D.C. Most deaths occurred in rural areas during events like the Elaine Massacre in Arkansas, where an estimated 100 to 240 black people and 5 white people were killed. Also occurring in 1919 were the Chicago Race Riot and Washington D.C. race riot which killed 38 and 39 people respectively, and with both having many more non-fatal injuries and extensive property damage reaching up into the millions of dollars.

See also
Washington race riot of 1919
Mass racial violence in the United States
List of incidents of civil unrest in the United States

Bibliography 
Notes

References  

   
 - Total pages: 930 
 - Total pages: 234 

1919 in Georgia (U.S. state)
1919 in military history
1919 riots in the United States
July 1919 events
African-American history between emancipation and the civil rights movement
History of racism in Georgia (U.S. state)
Racially motivated violence against African Americans
Red Summer
Riots and civil disorder in Georgia (U.S. state)
White American riots in the United States